The 2023 XFL Championship Game will be an American football game to play on May 13, 2023, at the Alamodome in San Antonio, Texas. The contest will determine the champion of the 2023 XFL season and be played between the winners of two semi-finals games.

References

2023 XFL season
XFL Championship Game
American football games
XFL Championship Game
American football competitions in San Antonio